Dixoa albatalis is a moth of the family Thyrididae first described by Swinhoe in 1889. It is found in Sri Lanka and India.

References

Moths of Asia
Moths described in 1889
Thyrididae